Sarcopetalum harveyanum, known as the pearl vine, is a common plant found mostly in coastal areas of eastern Australia. It can be found in or around rainforests, and is also seen in eucalyptus forests.

The leaf stalk is attached under the surface of the leaf. The leaves are heart shaped with raised leaf veins on both surfaces of the leaf. Seven veins branch out from the leaf base (A mid rib and three pairs of veins). The inner pair of veins extend almost all the way up the leaf.

Leaves are 4 to 12 cm long and 2 to 9 cm wide. The leaf stem is 1 to 8 cm long. The swelling at the base of the leaf stem is enlarged and evident.

Red or yellow flowers occur on racemes in summer. These racemes often grow from old wood on the vine. The flowers are tiny and seldom seen, petals 3 mm long. The fruit is a red drupe, 5 to 8 mm in diameter. They resemble a miniature bunch of grapes.

Pearl vine is food for the larvae of the moths Eudocima salaminia and Eudocima fullonia.

References 

 Plant Net http://plantnet.rbgsyd.nsw.gov.au/cgi-bin/NSWfl.pl?page=nswfl&lvl=sp&name=Sarcopetalum~harveyanum Retrieved 30 August 2009
 Rainforest Climbing Plants - Williams & Harden  page 25

Menispermaceae
Flora of New South Wales
Flora of Queensland
Flora of Victoria (Australia)
Taxa named by Ferdinand von Mueller